John Bromley may refer to:

John Bromley (translator) (died 1717), English clergyman, Catholic convert, and translator
John Bromley (politician) (1876–1945), English trade union leader, general secretary of ASLEF 1914–36, and Labour Party Member of Parliament for Barrow-in-Furness 1924–31
John Bromley (umpire) (born 1968), New Zealand cricket umpire
John Bromley, designer of Royal Doulton figurines
Sir John Bromley (soldier) (died 1419), English soldier and landowner at Baddington, Cheshire
John Bromley (the elder) (c. 1652–1707), plantation owner and English politician
John Bromley (the younger) (c. 1682–1718), English politician
John Selwyn Bromley (1913–1985), British naval historian